Striving for Fortune is a 1926 American silent drama film directed by Nat Ross and starring George Walsh, Beryl Roberts and Tefft Johnson.

Synopsis
In Newport News, Virginia, a shipbuilder working on a new vessel has to thwart attempts at sabotage by a rival company.

Cast
 George Walsh as Tom Sheridan 
 Beryl Roberts as Hope Loring 
 Tefft Johnson
 Joseph Burke
 Louise Carter
 Dexter McReynolds

References

Bibliography
 Munden, Kenneth White. The American Film Institute Catalog of Motion Pictures Produced in the United States, Part 1. University of California Press, 1997.

External links

1926 films
1926 drama films
Silent American drama films
Films directed by Nat Ross
American silent feature films
1920s English-language films
American black-and-white films
Films set in Virginia
1920s American films